Stephen K. Lundquist (born February 20, 1961) is an American former competition swimmer who is an Olympic gold medalist and former world record-holder. At the 1984 Summer Olympics in Los Angeles, he won gold medals in the 100-meter breaststroke and the 400-meter medley relay.

Lundquist was the first swimmer to break two minutes in the 200-yard breaststroke, and won every 100-yard breaststroke event he entered from 1980 to 1983. At age 17 he broke his first world record and in his career he set new world and American records on 15 occasions. He first broke the 100-meter breaststroke world record in 1982 and held it until 1989, with the exception of one month in 1984 when John Moffet broke it in June at the U.S. Olympic Trials (with Lundquist reclaiming it at the Olympic Games in July). He also held the world record in the 200-meter individual medley in 1978. He set American records in the 100-meter and 200-meter breaststroke and the 200-meter individual medley.

Coached by Arthur Winters, Lundquist switched from a butterfly swimmer when he was 12 years old to the breaststroke, which is the stroke he came to dominate. Winters was at the end of the pool when he broke his first world record at 17 years of age.

Lundquist went on after the 1984 Olympics to spend much of his time volunteering his time for charitable organizations and making appearances on television and in movies. In June 1985, People Magazine named him as having the Best Chest of male celebrities, including a full-page picture of his muscular torso. In 1996 when the Olympics were hosted in Atlanta, Georgia, he was an Olympic torchbearer, the Clayton County Master of Ceremonies for the torch run, and the Olympic flagbearer at the 1996 Olympic Games.

Achievements
 U.S. Honorary Olympic Team medalist, swimming, 1980
 United States Swimmer of the Year, 1982
 Olympia Award, 1983
 U.S. Olympic Team double gold medalist, swimming, 1984
 International Swimming Hall of Fame, inducted in 1990
 Georgia Sports Hall of Fame's youngest inductee, 1990
 Olympic flagbearer, torch-runner, emcee, 1996
 Voted America's Top Breast-Stroker of the Century By US Swimming
 Georgia State Games Cauldron Lighter, 1997
 3rd place, Super Dogs Super Jocks, 1998

Education
 Attended Woodward Academy, College Park, Georgia
 Graduated from Jonesboro High School, Georgia 1979
 Graduated (BBA) from Southern Methodist University (SMU) in 1984
 Graduated (MBA) from Northwestern University Kellogg Graduate School of Management (Executive Master's Program) 1994
 Graduate of Beverly Hills Playhouse School of Acting, and studied under Milton Katselas and Jeff Goldblum
 Studied voice under Ron Anderson

Appearances on America's major national talk shows
 Johnny Carson
 Larry King Live
 Joan Rivers
 Good Morning America
 This Morning
 The Today Show
 CNN Sports Talk
 Radio Talk Show Host during 1996 Summer Olympics
 Commentator for the 1986 Goodwill Games in Moscow

Acting credits
 Regular on Search For Tomorrow TV Soap
 Loveboat
 ABC TV's Actors to Watch Talent and Development Program
 Earth Girls are Easy
 Return of the Killer Tomatoes
 Beach Boys MTV video "It's Getting Late"
 Splash videos
 After School TV special nominated for an Emmy entitled "Testing Positive"

See also

 List of Olympic medalists in swimming (men)
 List of Southern Methodist University people
 List of World Aquatics Championships medalists in swimming (men)
 World record progression 100 metres breaststroke
 World record progression 200 metres individual medley
 World record progression 4 × 100 metres medley relay

References

External links
 Steve Lundquist – Athlete profile at Georgia Sports Hall of Fame 
 Steve Lundquist at the Georgia Sports Hall of Fame
 
 

1961 births
Living people
American male breaststroke swimmers
American male medley swimmers
World record setters in swimming
Kellogg School of Management alumni
Olympic gold medalists for the United States in swimming
People from College Park, Georgia
SMU Mustangs men's swimmers
Swimmers from Atlanta
Swimmers at the 1979 Pan American Games
Swimmers at the 1983 Pan American Games
Swimmers at the 1984 Summer Olympics
World Aquatics Championships medalists in swimming
Medalists at the 1984 Summer Olympics
Pan American Games gold medalists for the United States
Pan American Games bronze medalists for the United States
Pan American Games medalists in swimming
Medalists at the 1979 Pan American Games
Medalists at the 1983 Pan American Games
20th-century American people